The Calgary Outlaws were an independent minor league baseball team in the Canadian Baseball League.  Based in Calgary, Alberta, they shared Foothills Stadium with the Calgary Dawgs.  In 2003, the only Canadian Baseball League season, they had the best record when the league was suspended at the All-Star break and were thus awarded the Jenkins Cup.

Sources
 http://www.oursportscentral.com/sports/?t_id=1128

Baseball teams in Calgary
Defunct minor league baseball teams
Baseball teams disestablished in 2003
Defunct baseball teams in Canada
Baseball teams in Alberta
Defunct independent baseball league teams